Rochfort Bridge is a hamlet in Alberta, Canada within Lac Ste. Anne County. Rochfort Bridge is named for Cooper (Cowper) Rochfort, who with his associate, Percy Michaelson, homesteaded on the Paddle River at the point where the old trail from Lac Ste. Anne to the MacLeod River crossed the Paddle River.

One of North America’s longest wooden train trestles is located just east of the hamlet, which crosses over the Paddle River valley and Highway 43.

History 
A farm near Rochfort Bridge and Mayerthorpe was the site of the Mayerthorpe tragedy on March 3, 2005, in which four officers of the Royal Canadian Mounted Police were shot and killed in a raid on a marijuana drug operation.

On December 5, 2019, a fire broke out in a home inside the hamlet. In the early morning hours of December 6, fire crews announced a body had been discovered, and later on after a more extensive search, four more bodies had been discovered. Two adults, Marvin and Janet Gibbs, and their three grandchildren all were killed in the fire.

Demographics 
The population of Rochfort Bridge according to the 2008 municipal census conducted by Lac Ste. Anne County is 71.

Notable people 
Peter Trynchy – Canadian politician, Progressive Conservative MLA (1971-2001) and cabinet minister

See also 
List of communities in Alberta
List of hamlets in Alberta

References 

Hamlets in Alberta
Lac Ste. Anne County